Basildon is a town in Essex, England.

Basildon may also refer to:

Places in England
In Essex:
Basildon (district), a local government district
Basildon (UK Parliament constituency)
In Berkshire:
Basildon, Berkshire, a parish
Lower Basildon
Upper Basildon
Basildon Park, a country house in Lower Basildon

People
Angela Smith, Baroness Smith of Basildon
Basildon Peta, Zimbabwean journalist and publisher
Nigel Bond, a snooker player nicknamed "Basildon"

Other
, a coaster

See also
 Basildon Bond, a stationery brand
 Basildon railway station